Ellis Ferreira and Jan Siemerink were the defending champions but only Siemerink competed that year with Paul Haarhuis.

Haarhuis and Siemerink lost in the final 6–4, 6–7, 6–3 against Luis Lobo and Javier Sánchez.

Seeds
Champion seeds are indicated in bold text while text in italics indicates the round in which those seeds were eliminated.

n/a
 Paul Haarhuis /  Jan Siemerink (final)
 Sébastien Lareau /  Alex O'Brien (first round)
 Libor Pimek /  Byron Talbot (semifinals)

Draw

References
 1997 Sydney International Doubles Draw

Men's Doubles
Doubles